Playwrights Horizons Theater School is a studio in the Tisch School of the Arts Undergraduate Department of Drama. Its members are inspired by the synergy that comes in telling stories from every possible angle and diverse perspective. Playwrights champions the philosophy that every performer should write, every writer should direct, every director should design, every designer should perform and, of course, everyone should be on crew. Accordingly, the school invites established and emerging artists to collaborate and create contemporary work for, of, and by its students. Playwrights maintains that the investigation of many methods leads to innovations that invite an exciting and promising future for its students — and for the future of the American theater.

Notable alumni include Raúl Esparza, Leslye Headland, Jessica Hecht, Camila Mendes, Rachel Chavkin, Mara Wilson and Sam Pinkleton.

See also 
 Playwrights Horizons

References

New York University schools
Drama schools in the United States
Performing arts education in New York City
1980s establishments in the United States
Astor Place